The siege of Yongqiu (雍丘之戰, pinyin: Yōngqiū zhī zhàn) was a siege for Yongqiu (current Qi County, Kaifeng) in 756 AD during the An Shi Rebellion, by the An Lushan rebels against the Tang army. The Tang army, led by Zhang Xun, finally won this battle.

Background
An Lushan had enjoyed many successes early on in his rebellion. His army numbered more than 160,000, and was growing rapidly. In the fall of 755, An Lushan won a major victory at Luoyang, the eastern capital of the Tang Dynasty. With civilians losing faith in the Tang Dynasty, and more people and generals joining An Lushan's newly proclaimed Great Yan Dynasty every day, it seemed that the Tang Dynasty was near its end. An Lushan set his eyes on Chang'an, the capital of Tang.

Suiyang was of great military significance. If the Tang Dynasty could defend this area, An Lushan's influence would be limited to the north of China for the time being. This would give the Tang Dynasty enough time to prepare defences further south. If An Lushan conquered this area quickly, he would be free to conquer the rest of the resource-rich southern China.

At this time, the governor of the Suiyang District, Yang Wanshi (楊萬石), decided to surrender to An Lushan. The governor of the city of Yongqiu, Linghu Chao (令狐潮), agreed with the surrender after the fall of Luoyang, which in his view made the Tang cause hopeless. The army commander of Suiyang Fortress at this time was Zhang Xun. He refused to follow Yang Wan Shí's surrender orders, and instead gathered around 3,000 citizens and soldiers to combat the rebels.

Zhang Xun noticed that if Yongqiu remained in An Lushan's control, Suiyang would not be safe for much longer. As a result, he led an army of around 2,000 men to besiege the weakly-defended Yongqiu. At this time, Linghu Chao had imprisoned a few hundred loyal Tang soldiers within the fortress. To Zhang Xun's luck, these prisoners were able to escape (probably with the help of civilians or other uncaptured loyal soldiers), and caused massive chaos within the fortress. Zhang Xun took this opportunity to besiege the fortress. Yongqiu fell to Zhang Xun very quickly, and Linghu Chao escaped.

In February, Linghu Chao led 15,000 rebels back to Yongqiu, to try to take back the fortress. Zhang Xun however, left no weakness in his defence, with around 3,000 men. At the end of this first encounter, Linghu Chao had lost more than 10,000 men, and he was forced to retreat.

In March, Linghu Chao returned to besiege Yongqiu, with 40,000 rebels that he borrowed from Au Lushan. Only about 2,000 Tang soldiers were still capable of defending Yongqiu.

Process

Linghu Chao personally asked Zhang Xun to surrender, to which Zhang Xun replied, "For your whole life, you have been known for your loyalty. Where is your loyalty now?" Upon returning to the fortress, Zhang Xun decided that if he let the siege continue as it was, the fortress might fall within that day. So to everyone's surprise, he suddenly led 1,000 men out of the fortress to charge at Linghu Chao's position. The rebels were totally unprepared for the battle. Linghu Chao's numerous men retreated for a few miles, before returning to the fortress.

Linghu Chao then ordered his troops to surround Yongqiu, to cut off any chance of escape for Zhang Xun. Then the assault began with siege ladders. Zhang Xun had expected the siege, and prior to the battle ordered many grass-balls be made. He ordered his troops to dip these grass-balls into oil, and then light them up just before throwing them at the enemy. As the siege ladders burned, many of Linghu Chao's men burned or fell to their deaths. The situation seemed so hopeless that many rebels refused to climb the ladders. Linghu Chao decided that a direct assault could not win the battle, and hence he ordered his troops to simply surround Yongqiu until Zhang Xun ran out of food supplies.

Zhang Xun however had other plans in mind. He ordered his troops to play war drums during night time, which forced the rebels to prepare for battle. But the fortress gates remained closed, and no Tang troops appeared. After this was repeated many times, the rebels eventually grew tired and ignored the war drums. Zhang Xun then personally led many night ambushes against the rebels, by sneaking down the fortress walls, and escaping with his men just before being overwhelmed. These successful night ambushes greatly weakened the morale of Linghu Chao's men, as they had to sleep with constant fear, or did not sleep at all. These random night ambushes killed about 5,000 rebels.

Linghu Chao then resumed the attacks, but with little success. Even so, Linghu Chao was able to completely cut off all chances of food supplies getting into the fortress. This blockade tactic, however, did not have as large an effect as Linghu Chao had hoped for. Zhang Xun's extremely loyal troops were able to survive by hunting animals and insects within the fortress, such as rats and birds. They also had many successes drawing Linghu Chao's attention away from his food supplies, before stealing them.

After about 40 days of siege, news reached Yongqiu that Chang'an had fallen to An Lushan. This was a major blow to morale of Zhang Xun's army. Six of Zhang Xun's elite soldiers suggested that he surrender. Zhang Xun pretended to agree. In the following morning, he beheaded these six elite soldiers in front of the whole army and a portrait of the Tang emperor, on charges of treason. This once again strengthened the morale of the army.

The siege continued, and after 20 more days, Zhang Xun's troops had run low on arrows. He ordered his troops to make about 1,000 scarecrows. He then ordered his soldiers to put their own armor onto these scarecrows. During the night, the soldiers hung the scarecrows down the fortress wall, so as to be easily seen. Linghu Chao noticed a number of armored black figures in the distance, and ordered his archers to shoot at them, hoping to stop the ambush. When the scarecrows got pulled back over the wall, along with numerous embedded arrows, Linghu Chao realized that he had been deceived. He ordered his troops to never shoot at any black figures hanging down the wall, since it would be a waste of arrows. As a result, on the second night after the incident, no arrow was shot at the scarecrows.

On the third night, black figures were once again hung down from the wall, and they were once again ignored. This time the black figures, however, were not scarecrows. They were 500 of Zhang Xun's best men. They began the most damaging ambush of the siege. Many rebels were killed during their sleep. An estimated 10,000 men either were killed or deserted. The remaining force of about 20,000 men fled for about 10 miles before reorganizing.

Linghu Chao refused to retreat, and returned to Yongqiu to continue the siege. Zhang Xun was running low on lumber. He made Linghu Chao an offer: if Linghu Chao would move back 30 miles, and allow Zhang Xun and his men to escape, the fortress would be his. The battle-worn Linghu Chao immediately accepted. He moved his troops and supplies back 30 miles, but he did not remove the wooden huts and tents. Zhang Xun immediately ordered his troops to tear down the huts and tents, and bring the lumber back into the fortress. By the time Linghu Chao figured out Zhang Xun's plan, it was too late.

By this time, the rebels' battle morale had reached an all-time low. Eventually, Linghu Chao retreated with his forces to modern day Kaifeng with less than 20,000 men. After about 4 months of battle, Zhang Xun's much smaller army had earned a decisive victory over the rebels.

Aftermath
Smaller scale sieges and battles around the Yongqiu area continued well into November. Yan's army, when it needed to pass through this area, tried to go around the fortress instead of besieging it. But Zhang Xun led many ambushes against these attempts, with very successful results. In August, the famous Yan general Li Tingwang (李庭望) led an army of 20,000 to besiege Yongqiu. Zhang Xun ambushed them at night with 3,000 men, and killed over 10,000 rebels in the chaos. Li Ting Wang retreated before he even reached the fortress. In both October and November, Linghu Chao led two separate sieges of 10,000 men each, and both ended in failure.

By now, Zhang Xun had become famous for successfully defending against sieges despite seemingly overwhelming odds. Yan's army shifted their tactics. In December, Linghu Chao built a fortress north of Yongqiu to cut off Yongqiu's last supply route. At the same time, another betrayer of Tang named Yang Chaozong (楊朝宗) led 20,000 rebels to the east of Yongqiu, to cut off Zhang Xun's retreat route. Zhang Xun decided that he could no longer stay in Yongqiu. He led his remaining 3,000 soldiers to the east, and broke through Yang Chaozong's blockade, killing about 10,000 rebels in the process. Zhang Xun then rested his troops in Ningling (寧陵) (in modern-day Henan) for the next few weeks, after 1 year of battle.

In January 757 AD, An Lushan was killed by his own son An Qingxu (安慶緒). In the same month, An Qingxu ordered general Yi Ziqi (尹子奇) to besiege Suiyang. Yun Zi Qí joined with Yang Chu Zong before the siege, with a total army size of over 130,000 men. The governor of Suiyang at the time, Xu Yuan (許遠), knew of Zhang Xun 's fortress defense abilities and asked him for help. Zhang Xun knew that if Suiyang fell, the rest of Tang's territory south of the Yangtze River would be threatened. He immediately agreed to help and participated in the Battle of Suiyang.

Yongqiu
8th century in China
Yongqiu
756
An Lushan Rebellion